Tompaso is a highland district located about 45 km south-west of Manado in Minahasa Regency, North Sulawesi, Indonesia. It also refers to a sub-tribe as part of larger Tontemboan tribe in the Minahasa ethnic group.

Historical value 
According to history, Tompaso is believed to be the origin of Minahasa people before they spread all over the land of Minahasa. One of its villages, Pinabetengan, inherited a megalithic stone about 4 m long and 2 m high tagged with full of carved pictures. The pictures portray some kind of lifetime covenant of how Minahasans were supposed to divide their territory and live peacefully.

Information 
 Location: see map
 Geographic coordinate: 1.11 N, 124.73 E     
 Area: 30.2 km²
 Population: 13,672 (2003)
 Workforce: 8,736
 Growth: 4.81
 Density: 504 /km²

Villages     
 Tolok
 Pinabetengan
 Tonsewer
 Toure
 Kamanga
 Tember
 Liba
 Sendangan
 Talikuran
 Tompaso II
 Tempok

Key places 
 Mount Soputan, Toure Village
 230 MW Geothermal Power Plant
 Adventist High School, Tompaso II Village
 Salvation Army Orphanage, Liba Village
 Horse Racing Arena, Talikuran Village

External links 
 Tompaso Information
 Tompaso Geothermal Information

Photos
 Mount Soputan
 Watu Pinabetengan
 Rice Field Scenery

Districts of North Sulawesi